São João da Fresta is a freguesia in Mangualde, Portugal.

The population in 2011 was 208, in an area of 7.41 km2.

References

Freguesias of Mangualde